Revolution Man is an original novel written by Paul Leonard and based on the long-running British science fiction television series Doctor Who. It features the Eighth Doctor, Sam and Fitz.

Plot
The Doctor tries to stop a mysterious entity called The Revolution Man from spreading mind-altering drugs in the 1960s.

External links

1999 British novels
1999 science fiction novels
Eighth Doctor Adventures